Álvaro Rico Ladera (born 13 August 1996) is a Spanish actor. He is known for playing the character of Polo in the teen drama series Elite.

Career 
In 2011, he began his career as an actor in a theater adaptation of La Celestina and his television debut was in 2017 in an episode of Medical Center. Also in 2017, he played Nicolás in Velvet Colección.

In December 2017, he was announced as a main cast member in the teen drama series Elite. In the series, he played Polo, a bisexual teenager who is in a love trio with two other classmates.

In 2021, he gave an interview for Vanity Teen magazine talking about the impact of the series on society and his upcoming performances.

Filmography

References

External links 

 

1996 births
Living people
Spanish male television actors
21st-century Spanish male actors
People from Toledo, Spain
Male web series actors